Eriogonum angulosum is a species of wild buckwheat known by the common name anglestem buckwheat.

The plant is endemic to central and Southern California,  where it is common to abundant in many types of habitat, from chaparral and oak woodlands to sagebrush and the Mojave Desert sands.

Description
The leaves are located about the base of the plant and on the lower stem. They are lance-shaped and usually quite woolly in texture.

Most of the stem is made up of the inflorescence, an angled, grooved cyme with bell-shaped clusters of flowers at the tips of the branches. The individual flowers are only about a millimeter long and are white to pink-tinged in color with protruding stamens.

External links
 Calflora Database: Eriogonum angulosum (Angled stem buckwheat)
 Jepson Manual eFlora (TJM2) treatment of Eriogonum angulosum
U.C. Photos gallery of Eriogonum angulosum images 

angulosum
Endemic flora of California
Flora of the Sierra Nevada (United States)
Flora of the California desert regions
Natural history of the California chaparral and woodlands
Natural history of the California Coast Ranges
Natural history of the Central Valley (California)
Natural history of the Mojave Desert
Natural history of the Santa Monica Mountains
Natural history of the Transverse Ranges
Taxa named by George Bentham
Flora without expected TNC conservation status